Trud Stadium may refer to any of several stadiums in Russia:

Trud Stadium (Arkhangelsk)
Trud Stadium (Irkutsk)
Trud Stadium (Krasnodar)
Trud Stadium (Podolsk)
Trud Stadium (Tomsk)
Trud Stadium (Ulyanovsk)